Purple Hearts is a 2022 American romance film created for Netflix and directed by Elizabeth Allen Rosenbaum. It is based upon the novel of the same name by Tess Wakefield. It stars Sofia Carson and Nicholas Galitzine. Its story follows an aspiring singer-songwriter named Cassie and a marine named Luke, who agree to get married in order to receive military benefits and pay their debts. The film was released on July 29, 2022.

The rights for the film were originally owned by Alloy Entertainment, but Netflix bought the rights from them in August 2021. The production for the film started soon after that, with most of the scenes for the film shot in locations around Riverside and San Diego, California.

Plot 
Cassie Salazar is a waitress/bartender and performs with her band, The Loyal, at a bar in America. Diagnosed with Type 1 diabetes six months earlier, she struggles to afford insulin and works multiple jobs to try and make ends meet. One night, she serves a group of Marines who are soon to be deployed to Iraq. One of them, Luke Morrow, flirts with Cassie, but she turns him down. Luke has his own set of difficulties: he became an addict after his mom's death, and although two years clean, he still owes $15,000 to his dealer, Johnno. Estranged from his retired marine dad, he asks his brother for help, but his brother declines.

Cassie proposes to Frankie, a childhood friend and Luke's bunkmate, to benefit from the health insurance granted to military spouses. Frankie explains he plans to marry his sweetheart Riley. Although Luke overhears and advises against a fraudulent marriage, he realizes both their financial difficulties could be solved by getting married as Luke will make more money and Cassie will have access to military spouse healthcare. They eventually agree to marry before Luke deploys. Their plan is that after a year, they will file for divorce.

Frankie, the witness at the wedding, gives Cassie the ring he plans to marry Riley with, asking her to keep it safe. After, the newlyweds go to the bar with Frankie and Luke's fellow marines. Cassie argues with one of them over a toast about hunting down Arabs, resulting in an argument with Luke, but to keep up appearances they pretend to make amends. That night, he admits he is scared of both the marriage and Iraq. Cassie comforts him and they share an intimate night together.

The next morning, the Marines are deployed. Before he gets on the bus to leave, Luke gives Cassie contact information for his brother as she is now his next of kin. Cassie and Luke start sending emails and video calls to one another to keep up the ruse. She tells him that she wrote a song, "Come Back Home," for the Marines. She performs it for them, uplifting their spirits after a rough day.

The song goes viral. Luke asks Cassie if he is her muse, and Cassie concedes he may be. One night while performing, she receives a call that Luke has been severely injured after an IED went off and will be sent back. Cassie tries to contact Luke's brother but accidentally contacts their father, angering Luke, as his father is a retired MP marine officer who would turn them in. Afterwards, it is revealed Frankie was killed in action. At his funeral, she gives Riley the ring she promised to keep safe for him.

Luke, now a wheelchair user, moves into Cassie's apartment after being discharged from the hospital. Luke makes a wedding ring out of his dog tag chain for Cassie and they re-decorate their house to showcase their marriage for his father, who picks him up for physical therapy. Cassie adopts Peaches, a golden retriever, as an emotional support animal to aid in Luke's recovery.  Luke's rehab and their cohabitation inspire Cassie to write another song, "I Hate the Way," which she performs fabulously at Whisky a GoGo and captures the attention of record companies.

Still seeking his money, Johnno breaks Cassie's mother's window and threatens Luke. That night, Cassie's sugar level drops, sending her into shock. Luke helps her recover and they share a kiss. The next day, Luke beats Johnno up, gives him money and tells him to stay away. Instead, Johnno informs Cassie's mother about Luke's past. When Cassie confronts Luke, he reveals he had stolen his father's car to sell but crashed it instead, forcing him to borrow money from Johnno to pay him back. Cassie asks for a divorce and demands that he leave her apartment by the next day. When Luke returns home from a run, he is detained by the MPs, who were informed by Johnno of their fraudulent marriage. Luke's father calls Cassie to tell her of the charges and the impending trial.

At his trial, Luke pleads guilty, taking full responsibility and says that Cassie was unaware she violated military law. Luke is sentenced to six months in the brig after which he will receive a Bad Conduct Discharge.

Cassie's band is signed to a label and are opening for Florence and the Machine at the Hollywood Bowl. During the show, on the same day that Luke is to be jailed, Cassie sings her newest Luke-inspired song, "I Didn't Know," which she apparently wrote while waiting for Luke's trial.  After the show, she rushes to confess her love for Luke before he is sent off. Luke gives her his wedding ring and tells her "it's real now."

As the credits play out, six months later, Luke and Cassie are a happily married couple at the beach where they're enjoying a picnic with Peaches.

Cast 
 Sofia Carson as Cassie Salazar, a waitress, bartender and singer at a bar and Luke's "wife"
 Nicholas Galitzine as Luke Morrow, a U.S. Marine Lance Corporal and Cassie's "husband"
 Chosen Jacobs as Frankie, Luke's friend and the childhood friend of Cassie, whom she babysat when Frankie was younger
 John Harlan Kim as Toby, Cassie's record label owner
 Kat Cunning as Nora, Cassie's co-worker and best friend
 Linden Ashby as Jacob Morrow Sr., Luke and Jacob Morrow Jr.'s father
 Anthony Ippolito as Johnno, a drug dealer who Luke owes $50,000
 Scott Deckert as Jacob Morrow Jr., Luke's brother
 Sarah Rich as Hailey, Jacob Morrow Jr.'s wife
 Loren Escandon as Marisol Salazar, Cassie's mother
 Breana Raquel as Riley, Frankie's girlfriend
 Nicholas Duvernay as Armando, Luke and Cassie's rival
 A.J. Tannen as Dr. Grayson, Luke's doctor
 Michael C. Bradford as Cassie's stage manager

Production

Casting 
In November 2020 an announcement was made that Carson was set to star in Purple Hearts as the female lead for the film. In the announcement it stated that she would also be an executive producer, and write and sing the original songs for the soundtrack. In that same month it was revealed that Charles Melton had been cast as the male lead, but right before production started in August 2021, Galitzine was reported to be taking over the role.

In September 2021 Deadline reported that Chosen Jacobs, John Harlan Kim, Anthony Ippolito, Kat Cunning, Sarah Rich, Scott Deckert and Linden Ashby would round out the cast for the film. In the same report it was announced that Grammy nominee Justin Tranter would write and produce the original songs, with Carson co-writing and performing additional music.

Filming 
The principal photography for the Netflix original commenced in August 2021 and wrapped up in October of the same year. Filming took place in Los Angeles County, San Diego County, Riverside, and Austin, Texas.

The director, Allen Rosenbaum, worked with military adviser and Navy Veteran James Dever to get the Netflix project to film on base at Camp Pendleton. The first proposition was rejected, however, after Dever added his touch to the script, permission was granted to film. Deadline Hollywood described the film's budget as "thrifty."

Music 

Grammy Award-nominated singer/songwriter Justin Tranter wrote and produced the original songs for the Netflix original film. Carson also co-wrote and performed additional music for the project. On July 12, 2022, Hollywood Records released "Come Back Home" to help promote the film. Upon the Netflix release, the official soundtrack for the film was made available digitally. The tracklist consist of eight songs, all performed by Carson and includes four original songs co-written by Carson. On August 3, 2022, Sofia Carson released the official music video for "Come Back Home".

Reception

Viewership 
After spending one day on Netflix the film took the number one spot on the daily popularity charts, replacing The Gray Man from its eight-day run in USA. Within the first week of release, Netflix's Global Top 10 revealed that the film had 48.23 million hours watched. In its second week, the film had a total of 102.59 million hours viewed, which was as many hours as the next five films combined. By September, the film had logged 228.6 million hours watched.

In December 2022, Netflix announced the movie was the 3rd most watched movie of 2022 spending 6 weeks in the top 10s picking up 240.48 hours between July 24, 2022 and September 4, 2022.

Critical response 
 On Metacritic, the film has a weighted average score of 30 out of 100, based on six critics, indicating "generally unfavorable reviews".

Claire Shaffer from The New York Times critiqued the film, stating that the film "had the potential to be a poignant melodrama — or maybe a sharp satire" but "wallows in contrived plots and subplots". The reviewer also criticised the leads. Luke Y. Thompson from The A.V Club was also critical, negatively describing the love scenes that "convey neither heat nor emotional substance", and the songs as "overstuffed". David Ehrlich, reviewing from IndieWire, stated that the film was overwrought and "can’t settle down even though its two lead characters give each other something to be sure about for the first time in their lives".

Anti-military activists were angered that the movie portrayed the American military in a largely positive light and some claimed that some language used by characters in the story were offensive, which Allen later clarified was a part of the character development.

Future 
Director Elizabeth Allen Rosenbaum stated that "they’ve been casually chatting about doing more, but nothing is official." Carson added that she would love to see a sequel but "who knows. You never know!" Nicholas Galitzine has stated that they have joked privately about what would happen, but  "it would have to make sense. It would have to work. There are many different ways it could go, and we'll wait and see if it's the right story."

References

External links 

2020s English-language films
2022 films
2022 romantic drama films
Alloy Entertainment films
American romantic drama films
English-language Netflix original films
Films based on romance novels
Films based on young adult literature
Films directed by Elizabeth Allen Rosenbaum
Films set in 2021
Films set in Los Angeles
2020s American films